Fanny Moser (29 July 1848 in Winterthur, Switzerland – 2 April 1925 in Zurich, born Baroness Fanny Louise von Sulzer-Wart and known as Emmy von N. in Freud's study) was a Swiss noblewoman who at one point was known as the richest woman in Eastern Europe. She was one of the five women evaluated in Freud's Studies on Hysteria, which led to his psychoanalytic theories. Her father, Baron Heinrich von Sulzer-Wart had inherited his title from her grandfather, Johann Heinrich von Sulzer-Wart, who had been awarded a peerage for service to Maximilian I Joseph of Bavaria. On 28 December 1870, she married Swiss watchmaker and industrialist Heinrich Moser, who had made a fortune by developing high-quality watches to sell on the Russian market. H. Moser & Co. then expanded to include a factory in Switzerland and Heinrich founded a railway company in Schaffhausen, furthering his wealth.

The marriage caused scandal because Fanny was 23 and Heinrich 65, though both were from the upper echelons of society. The five older children from her husband's first marriage were fully grown, as their father had waited twenty years before his remarriage, but they rejected Moser. She had two children with Heinrich: , born 27 May 1872 and Luise, the author Mentona, born 19 October 1874, just four days before her father's death. The older children accused Moser of killing her husband and despite no evidence of foul play determined by two autopsies, suspicion continued. Moser had a mental breakdown and began seeing therapists in 1889. She acquired a castle, Schloss Au where she entertained lavishly, but was known for her eccentricities, continuing treatment for almost a decade. Late in life, she became infatuated with a much younger man, lost part of her fortune and cut off relationships with her daughters. When she died, she left millions to her daughters, though she had been convinced she was living in poverty. Moser was buried at the cemetery of Kilchberg, Zürich.

References 

1848 births
1925 deaths
People from Winterthur
Swiss nobility
Psychiatric assessment
19th-century Swiss people
19th-century Swiss women
20th-century Swiss people
20th-century Swiss women